Gamín (English: street urchins) is a 1977 Colombian documentary film written and directed by Ciro Durán.

Plot 
Narrated by Carlos Muñoz, a documentary on the subject of the life of the "street urchins", a word which refers to street children in Colombia, who have broken all family ties and struggle to survive on the streets of the city. The film illustrates, with shocking images, the homelessness and awful living conditions of these surviving children who are seen sleeping on the streets of Bogota, stealing food, car radios, selling cardboard, begging, etc.

External links 

Film excerpt

1970s Spanish-language films
Colombian documentary films
1977 documentary films
1977 films
Documentary films about street children
Films set in Bogotá